The metallic shiner (Pteronotropis metallicus) is a species of ray-finned fish in the genus Pteronotropis.

References 

 

Pteronotropis
Cyprinid fish of North America
Fish described in 1884
Taxa named by David Starr Jordan